Bhupinder Singh (born 18 May 1970) is an Indian actor.

Filmography

Television
 Jai Mahabharat as Angraj Karna
1857 Kranti as Nana Sahib
Yeh Pyar Na Hoga Kam as Triyogi Narayan Bajpayee
Madhubala – Ek Ishq Ek Junoon as Shamsher Mallik
Ek Hasina Thi as Dr. Dayal Thakur
Tere Sheher Mein as Dev Agnihotri
Kaala Teeka as Vishwaveer Jha
Rishton Ka Chakravyuh as Dhirendra Pandey

Films

References

External links
 

1970 births
Living people
Indian male television actors
Indian male film actors